The safety valve theory was a theory about how to deal with unemployment which gave rise to the Homestead Act of 1862 in the United States. Given the concentration of immigrants (and population) on the Eastern coast, it was hypothesized that making free land available in the West would relieve the pressure for employment in the East. By analogy with steam pressure (= the need for work), the enactment of a free land law, it was believed, would act as a safety valve. This theory meant that if the East started filling up with immigrants, they could always go West until they reached a point where they could not move any farther.

A distinction has to be made between (1) the safety valve theory as an ideal and (2) the safety valve theory as embodied in the Homestead Act of 1862.

There is a dispute whether and to what extent the Homestead Act did or did not succeed as a safety valve in ameliorating the problem of unemployment in the East.

Opposition to giving away free land came from employers, who anticipated either a shortage of employees or conditions favorable to employees.

References
 Goodrich, Carter, and Sol Davison, "The Wage-Earner in the Westward Movement. I. The Statement of the Problem," Political Science Quarterly, L (June 1935): 179-180.
 Goodrich, Carter, and Sol Davison,  " "The Wage-Earner in the Westward Movement. II. The Question and the Sources," Political Science Quarterly, LI (March 1936): 61-116.
 Robbins, Roy M., "Horace Greeley: Land Reform and Unemployment, 1837-1862," Agricultural History, VII, 18 (January 1933).
 Robbins, Roy M., Our Landed Heritage: The Public Domain, 1776-1936 (1942).
 Shannon, Fred A., A Post Mortem of the Labor-Safety Valve Theory, Agricultural History, XIX (January 1945): 31-37.
 Smith, Henry Nash, Virgin Land: The American West as Symbol and Myth (1950). Chapter XX: The Garden as Safety Valve

Political science theories